Qaa is a town in Baalbek-Hermel Governorate, Lebanon.

Qaa or QAA may also refer to:

 Qa'a, the last king of the First Dynasty of Egypt
 Qa'a (room), a guest room in Islamic architecture
 Quality Assurance Agency for Higher Education in the UK
 QAnon Anonymous, a podcast which researches and debunks conspiracy theories

See also 
 Q&A (disambiguation)
 Qa (Cyrillic), a letter
 Al-Qaa airstrike, a 2006 Israeli airstrike on Lebanon
 Qâa er Rîm, a populated place in the Beqaa Governorate of Lebanon